Pyridinium perbromide (also called pyridinium bromide perbromide, pyridine hydrobromide perbromide, or pyridinium tribromide) is an organic chemical composed of a pyridinium cation and a tribromide anion. It can also be considered as a complex containing pyridinium bromide—the salt of pyridine and hydrogen bromide—with an added bromine (Br2). The chemical is a solid whose reactivity is similar to that of bromine. It is thus a strong oxidizing agent used as a source of electrophilic bromine in halogenation reactions. The analogous quinoline compound behaves similarly.

Preparation 
Pyridinium tribromide can be obtained by reacting pyridinium bromide with bromine or thionyl bromide.

Properties 
Pyridinium tribromide is a crystalline red solid which is virtually insoluble in water.

Use 
Pyridinium tribromide is used as a brominating agent of ketones, phenols, and ethers. As a stable solid, it can be more easily handled and weighed precisely, especially important properties for use in small scale reactions. One example from the original publications on this chemical is the bromination of the 3-ketosteroid 1 to 2,4-dibromocholestanone (2):

References 

Oxidizing agents
Pyridinium compounds
Bromine compounds
Polyhalides